The  is a tilting DC electric multiple unit (EMU) train type operated by Central Japan Railway Company (JR Central) on the Chūō Main Line, Shinonoi Line and Shinetsu Main Line. The 383 series service the Shinano limited express services in Japan, as well as Home Liner services. It has also won the 1996 Laurel Prize.

Design
The trains were built jointly by Hitachi, Kawasaki Heavy Industries, and Nippon Sharyo.

Operations
 (Wide View) Shinano (Nagoya - Nagano)
 Home Liner Nakatsugawa
 Home Liner Tajimi

References

External links

 JR Central 383 series 

Electric multiple units of Japan
Central Japan Railway Company
Tilting trains
Hitachi multiple units
Kawasaki multiple units
Train-related introductions in 1994
Nippon Sharyo multiple units
1500 V DC multiple units of Japan